This is the list of tourist attractions in Malacca, Malaysia.

Community
 Chitty Village
 Hang Tuah Village
 Jonker Walk
 Little India
 Morten Village
 Portuguese Settlement

Convention centres
 Malacca International Trade Centre

Galleries
Upside Down House Gallery Malacca 
 Batang Tiga Police Station Gallery
 Casa Cuba
 Demang Abdul Ghani Gallery
 Gallery of Admiral Cheng Ho
 Macau Gallery Malacca
 Malacca Art Gallery
 Melaka Bee Gallery
 Malacca Chief Minister’s Gallery
 Malacca Craft Centre
 Malacca Folks Art Gallery
 Malacca Gallery
 Malacca Golf Gallery
 Malacca House

Historical buildings
 Porta de Santiago
 Middelburg Bastion
 Hang Li Poh's Well
 Hang Tuah's Well
 Malacca Light
 Melaka Warrior Monument
 Melaka Sultanate Watermill
 Portuguese Well
 Proclamation of Independence Memorial
 St. John's Fort
 Ruins of St. Paul's Church
 Stadthuys
 Tun Abdul Ghafar Baba Memorial
 Villa Sentosa

Libraries
 Jonker Street Library
 Malacca Main Public Library
 Malaysia Book Village

Lighthouses
 Cape Rachado Lighthouse
 Pulau Undan Lighthouse

Mausoleums
 Acehnese Headstone
 Alor Gajah British Graveyard
 Datuk Senara Mausoleum
 Dutch Graveyard
 Hang Jebat Mausoleum
 Hang Kasturi Mausoleum
 Hang Tuah Mausoleum
 Sultan Ali of Johor Mausoleum
 Tun Teja Mausoleum

Museums
 Aborigines Museum
 Agricultural Museum
 Baba Nyonya Heritage Museum
 Beauty Museum
 Cheng Ho Cultural Museum
 Chitty Museum
 Democratic Government Museum
 Education Museum
 Governor's Museum
 History and Ethnography Museum
 Kite Museum
 Magic Art 3D Museum
 Malay and Islamic World Museum
 Malaysia Architecture Museum
 Malaysia Prison Museum
 Malaysia Youth Museum
 Maritime Museum
 Melaka Al-Quran Museum
 Melaka Islamic Museum
 Melaka Literature Museum
 Melaka Stamp Museum
 Malacca Sultanate Palace Museum
 Melaka UMNO Museum
 People's Museum
 Royal Malaysian Customs Department Museum
 Royal Malaysian Navy Museum
 Straits Chinese Jewellery Museum
 Submarine Museum
 Toy Museum

Nature
 Asahan Waterfall
 Ayer Keroh Lake
 Batu Lebah Hill
 Besar Island
 Bukit Batu Lebah Recreational Forest
 Bukit Langsat Recreational Forest
 Bukit Serindit Recreational Park
 Chinese Hill
 Tanjung Tuan (Formerly Cape Rachado)
 Datuk Wira Poh Ah Tiam Machap Recreational Park
 Durian Tunggal Reservoir
 Forbidden Garden
 Gadek Hot Spring
 Garden of Thousand Flowers
 Jasin Hot Spring
 Jus Reservoir
 Klebang Beach
 Malacca Botanical Garden
 Malacca Forestry Museum
 Malacca Island
 Malacca River
 Malacca Tropical Fruit Farm
 Merdeka Park
 Paya Laut Linggi Recreational Forest
 Pengkalan Balak Beach
 Puteri Beach
 Selandar Agro Park
 Serompol Tehel Recreational Park
 St. Paul's Hill
 Sungai Udang Recreational Forest
 Tanjung Bidara Beach

Public squares
 1Malaysia Square, Klebang
 Alor Gajah Square 
 Ayer Keroh Square
 Dutch Square
 Jasin Square
 Rambai River Recreational Square

Religious places

Buddhist temples
 Xiang Lin Si Temple (香林寺)
 Seck Kia Eenh Temple

Chinese temples
 Cheng Hoon Teng Temple (青云亭)
 Poh San Teng Temple (宝山亭)

Churches
 Christ Church
 St. Francis Xavier's Church
 St. Peter's Church
 Tamil Methodist Church

Hindu temples
 Sri Poyatha Moorthi Temple
 Dewi Sri Maha Mariamman (Kutharai Kovil) Temple, Cheng Melaka

Mosques
 Kampung Hulu Mosque
 Kampung Kling Mosque
 Melaka Chinese Mosque
 Malacca State Mosque
 Malacca Straits Mosque
 Tranquerah Mosque

Sport centres
 Hang Jebat Stadium
 Hang Tuah Stadium
 Malacca International Motorsport Circuit
 Tun Fatimah Stadium, Semabok
 Asahan Saujana NSC Complex

Science centres
 Al-Khawarizmi Astronomy Complex, Masjid Tanah
 Melaka Planetarium

Shopping centres
 ÆON Mall Bandaraya Melaka
 Dataran Pahlawan Melaka Megamall
 Giant Bachang Malacca Mall
 Hang Tuah Mall
 ÆON Malacca Malacca, Ayer Keroh
 KiP Mart Bachang
 Mahkota Parade
 Malacca Mall
 Mydin Mall
 Tesco Malacca
 The Shore Shopping Gallery
 Elements Mall, Hatten City

Theme parks and resorts
 A' Famosa Resort
 Bayou Lagoon Park Resort
 Chin Chin Lake Extreme Park
 Laman Tiga Budaya
 Melaka Alive
 Melaka Wonderland, Ayer Keroh
 Mini Malaysia and ASEAN Cultural Park
 Pirate Park

Towers and arches
 Ayer Keroh Gateway Arch
 Taming Sari Tower

Zoos
 Malacca Bird Park
 Melaka Butterfly and Reptile Sanctuary
 Melaka Crocodile Farm
 Malacca Zoo
 The Shore Oceanarium
 Turtle Conservation and Information Centre
 Wildlife Theatre Malacca

Closed attractions
 Melaka Batik House Boutique
 Malacca Transportation Museum

Food
 Satay Celup
 Chicken Rice Balls
 Duck Noodles
 Melaka-style Wantan Mee
 Pai Tee (also known as Pie Tee and Top Hats)
 Ayam Pongteh
 Asam Pedas with Fish
 Portuguese Grilled Fish and Seafood
 Fishball Lobak
 Coconut Shake
 Putu Piring
 Peranakan Cuisine: Nyonya Laksa, Nyonya Cendol, Nyonya Kuih''
 Chitty Cuisine

See also
 List of tourist attractions in Malaysia

References

External links

Tourism in Malaysia

Malacca